Willis Green (1818–1893) Green was a U.S. Representative from Kentucky

Life
Willis Green, son of Stephen Green and Elizabeth Stuart Green, was born in Madison County, Kentucky about 1818. Willis owned a mill at the Falls of Rough. He served as member of the Kentucky House of Representatives in 1836 and 1837.

Green was elected as a Whig to the Twenty-sixth, Twenty-seventh, and Twenty-eighth Congresses (March 4, 1839 – March 3, 1845).

Green died in 1893, in Danville, Kentucky. He was buried at Cave Hill Cemetery in Louisville, Kentucky

References

External links

Members of the Kentucky House of Representatives
Whig Party members of the United States House of Representatives from Kentucky
19th-century American politicians
1794 births
1862 deaths
Burials at Cave Hill Cemetery